Charles W. Schroeder (about 1853–1903) served two terms on the Los Angeles, California, Common Council, the legislative branch of the city, in the 1880s. He also was a civil engineer for the Southern Pacific railroad.

Born in Prussia about 1843, Schroeder was married in Los Angeles to Marta Carbajal in April 1881. They had two daughters, Mrs. Hazel C. Blandford and Mrs. Martha Gristock, who operated the Webb Hotel at 642 Crocker Street.

Elected to two one-year terms, Schroeder represented the 1st Ward on the  Los Angeles Common Council, the legislative branch of the city,  serving from December 9, 1882, to December 8, 1884.

He died October 23, 1903, at the Patton Insane Asylum, where he had been living since he was committed October 13, 1894, on complaint of his wife.

References and notes
Access to the Los Angeles Times links may require the use of a library card.

American civil engineers
Los Angeles Common Council (1850–1889) members
19th-century American politicians
1853 births
1903 deaths
People from the Kingdom of Prussia
German emigrants to the United States
Engineers from California